Hunter is an English unisex given name. Notable people with the name include:

Hunter Doherty Adams, better known as Patch Adams (born 1945), American physician and activist
Hunter Biden (born 1970), American lawyer and son of U.S. president Joe Biden
Hunter Bishop (born 1998), American baseball player
Hunter Bradley (American football) (born 1994), American football player
Hunter Bryant (born 1998), American football player
Hunter Burgan (born 1976), American bassist
Hunter Carpenter, American football player
Hunter Davies (born 1936), British writer
Hunter Dekkers (born 2001), American football player
Hunter Foster (born 1969), American actor
Hunter J. Francois (1924–2014), Saint Lucian politician
Hunter Freeman (born 1985), American soccer player
Hunter Gomez (born 1991), American actor
Hunter Hayes (born 1991), American country music singer
Hunter Hearst Helmsley (born 1969), ring name of American wrestler Paul Levesque
Hunter Hillenmeyer (born 1980), American football player
Hunter Johnson (disambiguation), multiple people
Hunter Kampmoyer (born 1998), American football player
Hunter King (born 1993), American actress
Hunter Lewis (born 1947), American economist
Hunter Liggett (1857–1935), American general
Hunter Long (born 1998), American football player
Hunter Lovins (born 1950), American author, educator and promoter
Hunter Mahan (born 1982), American golfer
Hunter Meighan (1914–2008), American politician
Hunter McGuire (1835–1900), American physician
Hunter Niswander (born 1994), American football player
Hunter Pitts O'Dell (1923-2019), American activist
Hunter Parrish (born 1987), American actor
Hunter Pence (born 1983), American baseball player
Hunter Renfrow (born 1995), American football player
Hunter Reynolds (1959–2022), American visual artist and AIDS activist
Hunter Schafer, American fashion model, actress, artist, and LGBT rights activist
Hunter Shinkaruk (born 1995), Canadian ice hockey player
Hunter Smith (born 1977), American football player
Hunter S. Thompson (1937–2005), American writer
Hunter Tylo (born 1962), American actress
Hunter Wendelstedt (born 1971), American baseball umpire

Fictional characters
Hunter, a character from Neil Gaiman's 1996 novel Neverwhere
Hunter, a character from The Owl House
Hunter Bradley, a character in Power Rangers: Ninja Storm
Hunter Clarington, a character in Glee
Hunter Hollingsworth, a character from Degrassi
Hunter Throbheart, a character from WordGirl
Hunter Van Pelt, a character from the 1995 film Jumanji
Hunter Zolomon, a DC Comics supervillain known as Zoom
Hunter, the sergeant of the titular squad from Star Wars: The Bad Batch

See also
Hunter (surname)

English masculine given names
English feminine given names
English unisex given names